BOD or bod may refer to:

People
 Péter Bod (1712–1768), Hungarian theologian and historian
 Péter Ákos Bod (born 1951), Hungarian politician and economist
 Rens Bod (born 1965), professor in digital humanities and history of humanities at the University of Amsterdam
 Brian O'Driscoll (born 1979), Irish rugby player nicknamed "BOD"
 Bod Mellor, British painter born Dawn Mellor in 1970

Places and structures
 Bod, Brașov, a commune in Romania
 Bod, the native name of Tibet
 Bőd, the Hungarian name for Bediu village, Nușeni Commune, Bistriţa-Năsăud County, Romania
 Böd of Gremista, an ancient Shetland fishing booth

Science and technology
 Breakover diode, a gateless thyristor triggered by avalanche current
 Bilirubin oxidase, an enzyme
 Biochemical oxygen demand or "biological oxygen demand", a measure of organic pollution in a wastewater sample

Codes
 Bodmin Parkway railway station, National Rail station code BOD, a railway station in Cornwall, UK
 Bordeaux–Mérignac Airport, IATA code BOD, an airport serving Bordeaux, France
 bod, ISO 639-3 and -2 language codes for Lhasa Tibetan

Other uses
 Banco Occidental de Descuento, a Venezuelan bank
 Board of directors, a group of people who jointly supervise the activities of an organization
 Board of Deputies of British Jews
 BOD (consulting firm), an Indian management consulting firm
 BOD (psychedelic), a hallucinogenic drug
 Bod (TV series), a BBC children's television series
 Bodleian Library, a research library at the University of Oxford informally referred to as "the Bod"
 Book of Discipline, a Christian denominational book
 Books on Demand, a print-on-demand and self-publishing platform
 Mourvèdre, a grape varietal also known as Bod

See also
 Bonné de Bod (born 1981), South African television presenter and documentary film producer.
 Stefan de Bod (born 1996), South African cyclist
 Bodd (disambiguation)
 Bodh (disambiguation)
 Bodsworth (disambiguation)
 Body (disambiguation)